Echeveria amoena is a species of succulent plant in the family Crassulaceae, endemic to semi-arid areas of the Mexican states of Puebla, Tlaxcala, and Veracruz.

Description 
It is a herbaceous, perennial plant with a stem up to 8 cm long. It grows in the form of a compact rosette, commonly less than 5 cm in diameter, with fleshy, obovate-oblanceolate, full-margin and accumulated apex leaves.

The inflorescence is a simple, reddish zinc, 10 to 22.5 cm high, with several alternate ascending, succulent, green, reddish or pink-orange bracts. The corolla includes petals similar to bracts.

Taxonomy 
Echeveria amoena was described in 1875 by Edward Morren, attributed to Louis de Smet, in Annales de Botanique et d'Horticulture.

Etymology 

 Echeveria : generic name given in honor of Mexican botanical artist Atanasio Echeverría y Godoy (1771? -1803)
 amoena : epithet Latin meaning "pleasant" or "lovely"

Synonyms 

 Echeveria microcalyx Britton & Rose
 EcheveriEcheveria amoenaa pusilla A.Berger Echeveria amoenaEcheveria amoena

Echeveria amoena also forms the hybrid Echeveria subalpina × amoena , which is considered by some authors as the species E. meyraniana.

Gallery

References 

amoena
Plants described in 1875
Flora of Mexico